Priboj City Stadium is a football and track-and-field stadium in Priboj, Serbia. The stadium is mostly used by FK FAP. The stadium has an estimated standing capacity of 7,000 - 10,000 with no seats installed. It has a western and eastern stand. North of the stadium is separated by a concrete wall from Lim River, while the south side has a concrete wall with a gate for the eastern stand. West has a main gate plus a small side gate. The condition of the stands is decent, there is a few holes on the west, but overall the stands are durable, unlike some Serbian SuperLiga stadiums that are basically caving in. The current decent condition is mainly thanks to the way the stands were built. Separate blocks cover the cement base, instead of it being made of cement only (West). East is made of cement only and currently is in horrible shape.
Grass surface is also getting worse by every season. The stadium needs a renovation as soon as possible, with a possibility of only fixing the western stands, as they are not that bad. Eastern stand has to be completely rebuilt, as it is a practical ruin. But dreams of getting a new stadium in Priboj will probably be left as just that, dreams.

Stadium

Main Gate
Main gate and front of the stadium.

Good Old Days
Full stadium during the 70s.

Western Stand
This is the larger of the two existing stands.

Western stand as seen from east side of the stadium.

More photos
West close-up.
Another panoramic view.

Eastern Stand
The smaller of the two stands, usually reserved for visiting fans.

In this photo: Divlja Telad, fan group from Valjevo.

South side
The southern wall of the stadium.

In this photo: FK FAP & FK Radnički 1923 in 2010 season.

Videos
1995/96 Sloboda-Borac Čačak
2012/13 FK FAP Priboj - FK BORAC Šabac

Football venues in Serbia
Multi-purpose stadiums in Serbia